Fandène  (Serer : Fanđan,  or Fandane or Mbel Fandane) is a small village in Senegal  about 7 km from Thiès.  It is inhabited by the Serer people.

History 
Fandène or Fandane was one of the villages of the precolonial Serer Kingdom of Sine.  On 18 July 1867 at the Battle of Fandane-Thiouthioune (commonly known as the Battle of Somb), a war took place there at the stream of Fandane between the Serer people (followers of Serer religion) led by their King Maad a Sinig Kumba Ndoffene Famak Joof and his army and the Muslim Marabouts of Senegambia led by Maba Diakhou Bâ and his army.  The Serer forces defeated the Muslim Marabouts when they tried to launch a jihad and conquer Sine.  Maba Diakhou Bâ was killed in that battle.

Population 
About 5000 inhabitants

Geography 
The closest localities are Thies, Lalane, Somb, Mont-rolland, Peykouk, Keur Dembaand  Keur Diour, Thiouthioune.

Activities 
A traditional market is held there every Wednesday.  In January 2011, The Festival of Farmer's Seeds was also held there.

See also
Serer people
Kingdom of Sine
Kingdom of Saloum
Serer religion

Notes

Bibliography
 M. B. Gueye, Conflits et alliances entre agriculteurs et éleveurs : le cas du Goll de Fandène, IIED Dryland Network Programme Issue Paper n° 49, 1994
 Abbé Ruffray, « Fandène en liesse, fête le jubilé de ses premiers chrétiens », Horizons africains, n° 136, février 1962, p. 10-12
Sarr, Alioune, Histoire du Sine-Saloum, Introduction, bibliographie et Notes par Charles Becker, BIFAN, Tome
46, Serie B, n° 3–4, 1986–1987. pp 37–39
Gravrand, Henry, La civilisation sereer, vol. II : Pangool, Nouvelles éditions africaines, Dakar, 1990, p 474,

External links
 Maps, weather and airports for Fandane

Serer country
Villages in Senegal